James F. Antonio (born June 30, 1939) served as state auditor of the U.S. state of Missouri. A Republican from Cole County, he served from 1978 until his resignation in mid-1984.

References

State Auditors of Missouri
Missouri Republicans
People from Cole County, Missouri
Living people
1939 births